was a Japanese politician who was a member of the Diet of Japan. He served as Senior Vice-Minister for Foreign Affairs under the government of Junichiro Koizumi.

Abe was a native of Higashine, Yamagata Prefecture and graduated from Tohoku University.

Abe died on 25 October 2020, at the age of 77.

References 

1942 births
2020 deaths
Members of the House of Representatives (Japan)
Politicians from Yamagata Prefecture
People from Higashine, Yamagata
Tohoku University alumni